Volker Vogeler (27 June 1930 – 16 April 2005) was a German film director and screenwriter. He directed 13 films between 1967 and 2000. His 1971 film Jaider, der einsame Jäger was entered into the 21st Berlin International Film Festival.

Selected filmography

Director
Film
 Jaider, der einsame Jäger (1971) — screenplay with Ulf Miehe
 Yankee Dudler (1973) — screenplay with Ulf Miehe and Bernardo Fernández
  (1975)
 Moving Targets (1984)
Television
 Das Bild (1967) — screenplay with Günter Herburger
  (1968) — based on a novel by Marta Becker
 Die Söhne (1968) — screenplay with Günter Herburger
  (1970) — screenplay by Günter Herburger
 Varna (1970)
 Die Straße (1978) — screenplay by 
 Zwei Tore hat der Hof (1979) — screenplay with 
  (1980) — screenplay by 
 Jonny Granat (1982) — screenplay by 
 Tatort: Wat Recht is, mutt Recht bliewen (1982) — screenplay by Boy Lornsen and 
 Al Kruger (1984)
 Ein Kriegsende (1984) — based on a story by Siegfried Lenz
 Tante Tilly (1986, TV series)
 Kein Weg zurück (2000)

Writer
 Student of the Bedroom (dir. Michael Verhoeven, 1970) — based on a novel by 
 Output (dir. Michael Fengler, 1974) — based on a novel by Ulf Miehe
 The Old Fox (1978–2005, TV series, 181 episodes)

References

External links

1930 births
2005 deaths
People from Połczyn-Zdrój
People from the Province of Pomerania
German mass media people